Grevillea commutata is a species of flowering plant in the family Proteaceae and is endemic to the west of Western Australia. It is a spreading, open to dense shrub with egg-shaped leaves with the narrower end towards the base, and white, cream-coloured, and pinkish-green flowers.

Description

Taxonomy
Grevillea commutata was first formally described in 1868 by Ferdinand von Mueller in Fragmenta Phytographiae Australiae from specimens collected by Augustus Oldfield near Gregory. The specific epithet (commutata) means "changed" or "altered", referring to the variable leaf forms.

In 2000, Robert Owen Makinson described two subspecies in the Flora of Australia, and the names are accepted by the Australian Plant Census:
 Grevillea commutata F.Muell. subsp. commutata has mostly narrowly egg-shaped leaves with the narrower end towards the base, and flowers from October to February;
 Grevillea commutata subsp. pinnatisecta Makinson has mostly divided leaves and flowers from June to December.

Distribution and habitat
Grevillea commutata grows in heath or shrubland on sandplains, dunes and coastal breakaways from north of the Murchison River to the Greenough River and inland to Yuna in the Coolgardie, Geraldton Sandplains and Yalgoo biogeographic regions of western Western Australia.

Conservation status
This grevillea and both its subspecies are listed as "not threatened" by the Department of Biodiversity, Conservation and Attractions.

See also
 List of Grevillea species

References

commutata
Endemic flora of Western Australia
Eudicots of Western Australia
Proteales of Australia
Taxa named by Ferdinand von Mueller
Plants described in 1868